Ilya Vitalyevich Shurygin (born 28 July 1998) is a Russian football player. He plays for FC Amkal Moscow.

Club career
He made his debut in the Russian Professional Football League for SFC CRFSO Smolensk on 19 July 2017 in a game against FC Kolomna.

He made his Russian Football National League debut for FC Tom Tomsk on 25 August 2019 in a game against FC Chertanovo Moscow.

References

External links
 Profile by Russian Professional Football League

1998 births
Footballers from Moscow
Living people
Russian footballers
Association football defenders
FC Tom Tomsk players